Peg or Peggy Stewart may refer to:

Peggy Stewart (ship)
Peggy Stewart (actress) (1923–2019), American actress
Peg Stewart, American actress fl.1970s-1990s; in "Band Candy" episode of Buffy the Vampire Slayer

See also
Peggy Stewart House, Annapolis, Maryland
Margaret Stewart (disambiguation)
Stewart (surname)